Nelson Lake is a lake in Aitkin County, Minnesota, in the United States. It was named for M. Nelson, who owned land near the lake.

See also
List of lakes in Minnesota

References

Lakes of Minnesota
Lakes of Aitkin County, Minnesota